Heinrich Petraeus (Henricus Petraeus) (15891620) was a German physician and writer. He was Professor of Medicine at the University of Marburg. He was son-in-law of the chemist Johannes Hartmann (15681631). He is known for his Nosologia Harmonica Dogmatica et Hermetica. This was an attempt to find concord between rival medical theories of the time: those of the progressive chemical physicians (exemplified by Vesalius) and those of the tradition-based Galenists.

Notes 

1589 births
Date of birth unknown
Place of birth unknown
1620 deaths
Date of death unknown
Place of death unknown
Academic staff of the University of Marburg
17th-century German writers
17th-century German physicians
17th-century German male writers